is the largest and southernmost of the Gotō Islands in Japan. It is part of the city of Gotō in Nagasaki Prefecture. Gotō-Fukue Airport is on this island. As of July 31, 2016, the population is 38,481.

Climate
Fukue has a generally warm and very wet climate (Köppen Cfa) with hot and oppressively humid summers and cool, wet winters with practically no snowfall owing to the island’s southerly latitude. Despite this, during the winter months cold water transported south from the Sea of Okhotsk by the eastern side of the Siberian High makes for very gloomy weather with scarcely any more sunshine than the “San‘in” coast from Hagi to Wakkanai.

References

Islands of Nagasaki Prefecture